Dennis Pili-Gaitau (born 28 June 1989) is a New Zealand rugby union player who played for the  in the Super Rugby competition.  His position of choice is fly-half or centre.

References 

New Zealand rugby union players
1989 births
Living people
Rugby union fly-halves
Rugby union centres
North Harbour rugby union players
New Zealand expatriate rugby union players
Expatriate rugby union players in Australia
Greater Sydney Rams players
Melbourne Rebels players
Expatriate rugby union players in France
Sydney (NRC team) players
US Carcassonne players